La Verde (Chaco)  is a village and municipality in Chaco Province in northern 
Argentina.

References

Populated places in Chaco Province